ABC South West Victoria (call sign: 3WL) is an ABC Local Radio station based in Warrnambool, Victoria.

South West Victoria
Radio stations in Victoria